Branch is an unincorporated community and census-designated place in Acadia Parish, Louisiana, United States. As of the 2010 census, it had a population of 388.

Demographics

References

Census-designated places in Louisiana
Census-designated places in Acadia Parish, Louisiana